Justine Miceli is an American actress.

Life and career
Miceli was born in Sunnyside, Queens, New York. Miceli studied acting at the American Academy of Dramatic Arts.  Early in her career, she acted in television commercials, off-Broadway shows, and traveled with touring theater companies.

Miceli appeared on daytime television and some primetime series. Miceli's big break came in 1994, when she was added to the cast of NYPD Blue, a controversial primetime series on ABC.  From 1994 to 1996, she played detective Adrienne Lesniak. Miceli left the series in 1996, along with Gail O'Grady and Sharon Lawrence. Since leaving NYPD Blue, Miceli guest starred on The X-Files, Seinfeld, New York Undercover, The Pretender, The Sopranos, Sliders, Judging Amy and Strong Medicine.

In the late 1990s, while still seeking acting roles, Miceli began working as a home organizer, including an executive position in a professional association for that industry. Since her last on-screen role in 2002, Miceli has moved away from acting and is the full-time owner/operator of an organization business based in Santa Monica, California.

Filmography

References

External links
 

1959 births
Living people
Actresses from New York City
American film actresses
People from Sunnyside, Queens
American television actresses
American soap opera actresses
20th-century American actresses
21st-century American actresses